The 2012 Women's Australian Hockey League was the 20th edition of women's field hockey tournament. The tournament was held in the Western Australia city of Perth.

The VIC Vipers won the gold medal for the second time by defeating the NSW Arrows 5–1 in the final.

Teams

  Canberra Strikers
  NSW Arrows
  NT Pearls
  QLD Scorchers
  SA Suns
  Tassie Van Demons
  VIC Vipers
  WA Diamonds

Results

First round

Second round

Fifth to eighth place classification

Crossover

Seventh and eighth place

Fifth and sixth place

First to fourth place classification

Semi-finals

Third and fourth place

Final

Statistics

Final standings

Goalscorers

References

External links

2012
2012 in Australian women's field hockey